Michal Lupač (born 15 May 1984) is a professional Czech footballer who plays as a goalkeeper for Hodonín.

Club career

MFK Skalica
He made his professional Fortuna Liga debut for Skalica against Spartak Trnava on 6 November 2015. He conceded from David Depetris and Martin Mikovič in the 2:1 defeat.

References

External links
 
 Fortuna Liga profile
 Futbalnet profile
 Eurofotbal profile

1984 births
Living people
Czech footballers
Association football goalkeepers
MFK Skalica players
Slovak Super Liga players
Expatriate footballers in Slovakia
Czech expatriate sportspeople in Slovakia
Place of birth missing (living people)